Baihou Town is a town under the administration of Dabu County, Meizhou, Guangdong, China.

Administrative divisions 

Baihou Town contains the following administrative divisions:

Caonian Village (曹鲇村), Ruanqiao Village (​软桥村), Jiuzhaili Village (旧寨里村), Maoshan Village (​帽山村), Qutan Village (曲滩村), Hengqian Village (横乾村), Dongshan Village (​东山村), Nanshan Village (​南山村), Xinle Village (​新乐村), Suguping Village (​苏姑坪村), Wutang Village (​武塘村), Bailuo Village (​白罗村), Hounan Village (​侯南村), and Houbei Village (侯北村).

Chinese traditional village

Notable people
Yang Yongsong (Hounan Village), major general in the People's Liberation Army and Communist Party politician

References 

Dabu County
Towns in Guangdong